White bottlebrush is the common name of several plants native to Australia and may refer to:

Banksia integrifolia
Callistemon salignus, endemic to eastern Australia